Pradosia grisebachii is a species of plant in the family Sapotaceae. It is found in Trinidad and Tobago and Venezuela.

References

grisebachii
Least concern plants
Taxonomy articles created by Polbot